Zulauf is a surname. Notable people with the surname include:

Felix Zulauf (born 1950), Swiss businessman
Fritz Zulauf (1893–1941), Swiss sport shooter
Juliusz Zulauf (1891–1943), Polish army general

Surnames of German origin